John Ewing O'Hearn (July 28, 1893 – July 22, 1977) was a professional American football player. He played in the National Football League (NFL) in 1920 with the Cleveland Tigers and in 1921 with the Buffalo All-Americans. O'Hearn graduated from Cornell University, where he was a member of the Sphinx Head Society.  He was elected to the College Football Hall of Fame in 1972.

His younger brother, Ed O'Hearn, played for the NFL's New York Brickley Giants in 1921. Both brothers played for the Tigers in 1920.

References

1893 births
1977 deaths
American football ends
Buffalo All-Americans players
Cleveland Tigers (NFL) players
Cornell Big Red football players
All-American college football players
College Football Hall of Fame inductees
Sportspeople from Brookline, Massachusetts
Players of American football from Massachusetts